Microphysetica hermeasalis is a moth from the family Crambidae. The moth was discovered by Francis Walker in 1859, and it is found in Venezuela, Mexico, Central America (including Honduras and Costa Rica), the Antilles and Florida. Its wingspan is 9–10 mm.  Adults are on wing from March to June and from November to December in Florida.

References

Moths described in 1859
Spilomelinae